Bryleeh Flo Henry (born 5 May 2003) is an Australian soccer player who plays for Melbourne City in the A-League Women. She has previously played for Western Sydney Wanderers.

Early life
Henry grew up in NSW and played for FNSW Institute in New South Wales in her youth.

Club career

Western Sydney Wanderers
In December 2020, Henry joined A-League Women club Western Sydney Wanderers ahead of the 2020–21 W-League season. A couple of weeks later, she made her debut for the club in a 3–0 loss to Sydney FC, starting the match and playing 76 minutes before being subbed off. In August 2021, the club re-signed Henry for the 2021–22 A-League Women season.

Melbourne City
In September 2022, Henry joined fellow A-League Women club Melbourne City on a two-year contract.

International career
Henry was a part of the Junior Matildas team during the 2019 AFC U-16 Women's Championship. She featured during one match of the tournament, playing the full 90 minutes in a 0–0 draw with Japan.

On 21 November 2020, Henry was called up for the first ever Women's Talent Identification Camp which was held in Canberra from 22 – 26 of November 2020.

References 

2003 births
Australian women's soccer players
Living people
Western Sydney Wanderers FC (A-League Women) players
Melbourne City FC (A-League Women) players
A-League Women players
Women's association football forwards
Sportswomen from New South Wales
Soccer players from New South Wales